The California Beet Sugar Company (also known as the Standard Sugar Refining Company, Pacific Coast Sugar Company, Alameda Sugar Company, and the Holly Sugar Company) was the first successful sugar beet factory in the United States. It was located in Alvarado, which has been incorporated into the city of Union City and its site is on the California Historical Landmarks list.

History

The sugar factory was started in 1870 by E. H. Dyer, his brother Ephriam Dyer, C.I. Hutchinson, who served as president, W.F. Garratt, B.P. Flint, T.G. Phelps, W.B. Carr, E.R. Carpenter, and E.G. Rollins. The factory was built on farmland owned by Dyer. B.F. Ingalls served as the architect and builder. The factory opened officially on November 15, 1870. The machines used in the factory were imported from Germany. The building was located along the Alameda Creek, for transportation purposes, since there weren't any railroads. Sugar was distributed via a wheel steamer named "The Rosa," to San Francisco from the factory. In the first year of production it processed 293 tons of beet sugar. In 1873 the factory closed due to financial reasons. The equipment was sold to another plant in Soquel, California. The factory was demolished in 1977.  Imperial Sugar bought Holly Sugar Company in 1988.

Legacy
One predecessor to the Alvarado factory was Germania Sugar, founded by Ernst Theodore and Gottlieb Gennert in Chatsworth Illinois in 1863.  An insufficient water supply and soil which was poorly suited to sugar beets led to disbanding the Chatsworth operation in 1870.  While not a commercial success, lessons from the Chatsworth venture were valuable to beet sugar cultivation and manufacture elsewhere in the United States.

The former site of the factory is listed on the California Historical Landmarks list.

E.H. Dyer passed away in 1906.  Dyer Street in Union City has been named after him in his honor.

References

Union City, California
California Historical Landmarks
1870 establishments in California
Companies based in Alameda County, California
Companies based in Union City, California
Food and drink in the San Francisco Bay Area
Agriculture in California
Food and drink companies based in California
Sugar companies of the United States
Defunct manufacturing companies based in the San Francisco Bay Area